An outlying territory or separate area is a state territory geographically separated from  its parent territory and lies beyond Exclusive Economic Zone of its parent territory.

The tables below are lists of outlying territories which are marked by distinct, non-contiguous maritime boundaries or land boundaries:

Outlying geographical regions

Outlying territories outside the continent

Outlying uninhabited dependent territories

Outlying dependent territories and areas of special sovereignty

Notes 

 1. Enclaves are not included.
 2. Disputed outlying territories in the Spratly Islands are not included.

See also 

 List of sovereign states
 List of dependent territories

External links 
 Maritime boundaries
  Countries’ EEZ
Wiktionary-outlying
 A European outlying territory
 Map of Spratly Islands

Borders
Dependent territories